Aulacophora ancora is a species of leaf beetle in the genus Aulacophora.

References

Aulacophora
Beetles described in 1868
Taxa named by Ludwig Redtenbacher